Qarz Al-Hasaneh Mehr Iran Bank (Bank Qârzalhesinuh-e Miher-e Iran), also known as QMB, is an Iranian financial services and banking company that provides offering retail services, investment management and Gharz al-Hasna facilities. Gharz al-Hassaneh Mehr Bank of Iran, with an initial capital of 15,000 Milliard Rials and with the participation of  Iranian government owned specialized banks, was inaugurated by then-President Mahmoud Ahmadinejad in 2007. The central branch of this bank is located in Tehran.

History 
QMB with an initial capital of 15,000 milliard Rials and the participation of 10 major banks in the country was inaugurated by the then President Mahmoud Ahmadinejad on 12/13/2007 and received an official license from the Central Bank of Iran on 8/27/2008. The initial capital of Bank Mehr Iran at the beginning of its activity was 15,000 billion Rials, until with the approval of the General Assembly in 1399, the capital of this bank increased to 25,000 billion Rials. The bank started with 300 independent branches (assigned by shareholder banks) and 1,700 counters in selected branches of Bank Melli Iran and Bank Saderat Iran, after which the branches continued to operate independently and the counters located in shareholder banks were disbanded.

On January 10, 2019, the Central Bank of Iran issued an official license to the bank.

Sanctions 
On October 8, 2020 the United States Department of the Treasury sanctioned 18 Iranian banks, including Mehr Iran Bank, which the department claims are "additional avenue that funds the Iranian government’s malign activities".

fund
The initial capital of Bank Mehr Iran at the beginning of its activity was 15,000 billion Rials, until with the approval of the General Assembly in 1399, the capital of this bank increased to 25,000 billion Rials.

Bank shareholders
The shareholders of Bank Mehr Iran include Bank Melli Iran, Bank Mellat, Bank Saderat Iran, Bank Sepah, Tejarat Bank, Bank Maskan, Bank Keshavarzi Iran, Refah Bank, Bank of Industry and Mine and Export Development Bank of Iran.
Bank Melli Iran 21.5%
Bank Mellat 15.5%
Bank Saderat Iran 14.3%
Sepah Bank 11.3%
Tejarat Bank 11.7%
Bank Maskan 9.8%
Bank Keshavarzi Iran 9.8%
Refah Bank 3.5%
Bank of Industry and Mine 2.04%
Export Development Bank of Iran 0.96%

International issues
Mehr Bank of Iran was opened as the first Qarz al-Hasna Bank in the country on December 13, 2007 and on September 27, 2008 it received the official license of the Central Bank.
 Selected as the third top bank in the Islamic world in 2018
 Awarding the Islamic World Economic Elite Award to Seyed Saeed Shamsinejad (CEO of Gharz al-Hasna Mehr Bank of Iran)

See also

Banking in Iran
Mehr Housing Project

External links
Qarz Al-Hasaneh Mehr Iran Bank

References

Banks of Iran
Banks established in 2007
Iranian companies established in 2007